Kintetsu is the abbreviation of , or Kintetsu Railway, a Japanese railway corporation.

It may also refer to:

Companies
 Kintetsu Group Holdings, the holding corporation of the Kintetsu Railway
 Kintetsu Bus, a bus company and a subsidiary of Kintetsu Group Holdings
 Kintetsu Department Store, a department store chain and a subsidiary of Kintetsu Group Holdings
 Kintetsu World Express, a logistics service provider and a subsidiary of Kintetsu Group Holdings

Sports organizations
 Kintetsu Liners, a rugby union football team belonging to the Top League in Japan
 Osaka Kintetsu Buffaloes, a former professional baseball team belonging to the Pacific League of Nippon Professional Baseball
 Kintetsu Buffaloes, the previous name of Osaka Kintetsu Buffaloes
 Kintetsu Pearls, the previous name of Osaka Buffaloes

Train types
 Kintetsu 6820 series
 Kintetsu 7000 series
 Kintetsu 7020 series
 Kintetsu 9020 series
 Kintetsu 9820 series
 Kintetsu 15400 series
 Kintetsu 16600 series
 Kintetsu 22000 series
 Kintetsu 22600 series
 Kintetsu 23000 series
 Kintetsu 50000 series